Aagaard Islands  also known as Bjarne Aagaard Islands or Ostrova B'yarne-Ogor, are a group of small islands lying to the west of Proclamation Island and Cape Batterbee, near the coast of Antarctica in the Southern Ocean.  They were discovered in January 1930 by the British Australian and New Zealand Antarctic Research Expedition (BANZARE) under Sir Douglas Mawson, and were named after .

See also 
 List of Antarctic and sub-Antarctic islands

References

Islands of Enderby Land